Chula Vista is a summit in Taney County in the U.S. state of Missouri. The summit lies along Missouri Route 248 at the intersection with Buchannan Road and is approximately four miles north of Branson.

Chula Vista was named after Chula Vista, California, by a settler who had visited the city. The name is Spanish for "pretty view".

References

Mountains of Missouri